The Wilhelmsgymnasium is a gymnasium (selective school) in Munich, Germany. Founded in 1559 to educate local boys, it is now coeducational. 

Wilhelmsgymnasium is one of the few remaining gymnasiums in Bavaria to be a "pure Humanistisches Gymnasium" (humanities gymnasium), meaning that it traditionally focuses on the Classics: all students are required to study Latin, English, and Ancient Greek, in addition to mainstream school subjects.

History
The Gymnasium was founded in 1559 by Duke Albrecht V of Bavaria as a "Paedagogium", but was renamed in 1849 after its probable sponsor, Duke Wilhelm V. By 1773, the Gymnasium was overseen by the Jesuits ("Jesuit Gymnasium"). The present building on Thierschstraße (corner of Maximilianstraße) was erected in 1879 in Neo-Renaissance style. In 1893 it was granted Seminarschule status, meaning that it accepted trainee teachers. 

Much of the school compound was destroyed during the Allied bombing of Munich in 1944 and eventually rebuilt over the years. Girls were admitted during the 1970s. Between 2015 and 2018 the school operated out of a temporary location while the historic building's interior was completely gutted and refurbished with modern facilities. It re-opened for the 2018–19 academic year.

Notable former pupils

 Johannes R. Becher
 Count Otto von Bray-Steinburg
 Anton Diabelli
 Lion Feuchtwanger 
 Franz Xaver Gabelsberger
 Heinrich Himmler
 Carl Jung
 Philipp Loewenfeld
 Golo Mann
 Klaus Mann
 Max von Pettenkofer
 Richard Riemerschmid
 Carl Spitzweg
 Johann Georg Seidenbusch
 Ludwig Thoma
 Gunnar B. Stickler
 Hermann Stieve
 Konstantin Wecker
 Maximilian von Weichs

References

External links
 Official Homepage of the Wilhelmsgymnasium
 Research on the history of the Wilhelmsgymnasium München by Peter Kefes 

Schools in Bavaria
Education in Munich
Educational institutions established in the 1550s
1559 establishments in the Holy Roman Empire